Laxmi Ratan Shukla  (born 6 May 1981), is a former Indian cricketer and politician. He played as a right-handed middle-order batsman and a right-arm medium-pace bowler for the Bengal cricket team. He was also a player in the IPL team Kolkata Knight Riders, Delhi Daredevils, and the Sunrisers Hyderabad. He was a member of the legislative assembly of West Bengal representing the All India Trinamool Congress. He resigned from the ministry on 5 January 2021.

Early life
Shukla was born in Howrah, West Bengal, and did his schooling at Shree Hanumaan Jute Mill Hindi High School and the Don Bosco High & Technical School, Liluah. He caught attention in the Ranji Trophy in the 1997–98 season, and rose to prominence for performing well for the Indian under-19s team in the MTN Youth World Cup in South Africa. He was a part of the Bengal team in the Wills Trophy, in which they got to the semi-final. In 2000 he was picked for the National Cricket Academy.

On 30 December 2015 he announced his retirement from all forms of cricket.

International career
Because of impressive performances in domestic level Shukla got a national call in 1999. He was dropped in favour of Ashish Nehra in the first Test he was selected to play, against Sri Lanka at Colombo in the Asian Test Championship, even after his name appeared in the 11-member squad flashed on the electronic scoreboard at the ground. He made his ODI debut against Sri Lanka on 22 March 1999 in Nagpur. He played his last ODI against West Indies in 1999.

In fact he did not get further chances after that season as a bowler because other young pace bowlers like Zaheer Khan and Ashish Nehra had entered and established their places in the Indian Senior team, upon the impressive performances.

Although Shukla was renowned for his skills as an all rounder, selectors gave the chances for the players like Sanjay Bangar , Kanitkar and eventually Irfan Pathan pushing him down the pecking order.

Vijay Hazare Trophy 2012
He was by far the brightest performer as Bengal (captained by Sourav Ganguly) won its first Vijay Hazare Trophy in 2012. In the group stage match against Jharkhand at Eden Gardens, he scored 151* from 96 balls (16 fours, 8 sixes) to chase down Jharkhand's score of 280/6 in just 38.1 overs. In the next match against Tripura at the Jadavpur University Sports Complex, after being bowled out to only 198 in 49 overs, he took 4/37 (and Sanjib Sanyal took 4/33 from his 8 overs) to bowl out Tripura for just 168 in 37.4 overs. In the quarter final, he took 2/37 against Madhya Pradesh. He took the wicket of Punjab's highest scorer Mandeep Singh (66) in the semifinal. In the final against Mumbai led by Ajit Agarkar, he took 4/38 (including openers Wasim Jaffer and Ajinkya Rahane) to bowl out Mumbai for only 248, and then chased it down with a 107* off 83 ball-partnership with Anustup Majumdar. He scored 106* from 90 balls, and Anustup Majumdar scored 50* from 45 balls to win the Vijay Hazare Trophy with 23 balls to spare.

Vijay Hazare Trophy 2013
Following his success as an all rounder in the Vijay Hazare Trophy 2012, he was made the captain of Bengal in the Vijay Hazare Trophy 2013. He started the tournament brilliantly, taking 5/34 and thus restricting Odisha to only 175, and winning the match by 11 runs.

Political career 
He joined All India Trinamool Congress before 2016 West Bengal Legislative Assembly election and became candidate from Howrah Uttar constituency. He won the seat by defeating Santosh Kumar Pathak of Indian National Congress. He became the minister of State Sports and Youth Services in Mamata Banerjee's second government. On 5 January 2021, he resigned as the Minister of State for Youth Services and Sports.

References

1981 births
Trinamool Congress politicians from West Bengal
Bengal cricketers
Cricketers from West Bengal
Don Bosco schools alumni
East Zone cricketers
Indian cricketers
India Green cricketers
India One Day International cricketers
Indian sportsperson-politicians
Kolkata Knight Riders cricketers
Living people
People from Howrah
State cabinet ministers of West Bengal
Sunrisers Hyderabad cricketers
West Bengal MLAs 2016–2021